Brentwood is a town in the Borough of Brentwood, in the county of Essex in the East of England. It is in the London commuter belt, situated 20 miles (30 km) east-north-east of Charing Cross and close by the M25 motorway. In 2017, the population of the town was estimated to be 54,885.

Brentwood is a suburban town with a small shopping area and high street. Beyond this are residential developments surrounded by open countryside and woodland; some of this countryside lies within only a few hundred yards of the town centre.

Since 1978, Brentwood has been twinned with Roth in Germany and with Montbazon in France since 1994. It also has a relationship with Brentwood, Tennessee in the United States.

History

Etymology
The name was assumed by some in the 1700s to derive from a corruption of the words 'burnt' and 'wood', with the name Burntwood still visible on some 18th-century maps. However, brent was the middle English for "burnt". The name describes the presumed reason for settlement in the part of the Forest of Essex (later Epping Forest) that would have covered the area, where a major occupation was charcoal burning.

Early history
Although a Bronze Age axe has been found in Brentwood and there are clear signs of an entrenched encampment in Weald Country Park, it is considered unlikely that there was any significant early settlement of the area. At the time, most of Essex was covered by the Great Forest. It is believed that despite the Roman road between London and Colchester passing through the town, the Saxons were the earliest settlers of the area.

The borough was on a crossroads, where the Roman road from Colchester to London crossed the route the pilgrims took over the River Thames to Canterbury. A chapel was built in or around 1221, and in 1227 a market charter was granted. Its growth may have been stimulated by the cult of St. Thomas the Martyr, to whom the chapel was dedicated: the 13th-century ruin of Thomas Becket Chapel was a popular stopping point for pilgrims on their way to Canterbury. The ruin stands in the centre of the high street and the nearby parish church of Brentwood, built in the 1880s, retains the dedication to St. Thomas of Canterbury. Pilgrims Hatch, or 'Pilgrims' gate', was probably named from pilgrims who crossed through on their way to the chapel. It is likely, however, that Brentwood's development was due chiefly to its main road position, its market, and its convenient location as an administrative centre. Early industries were connected mainly with textile and garment making, brewing, and brickmaking.

During the Peasants' Revolt of 1381, Brentwood was the meeting place for some of the instigators, such as John Ball and Jack Straw. They apparently met regularly in local pubs and inns. The first event of the Peasants' Revolt occurred in Brentwood, when men from Fobbing, Corringham and Stanford were summoned by the commissioner Thomas Bampton to Brentwood to answer as to who had avoided paying the poll tax.  Bampton insisted that the peasants pay what was demanded of them. The peasants refused to pay and a riot ensued as Bampton attempted to arrest the peasants. The peasants moved to kill Bampton, but he managed to escape to London. The rioters then, fearing the repercussions of what they had done, fled into the forest. After the riot the peasants sent word to the rest of the country and initiated the Peasants' Revolt. 

The Essex assizes were sometimes held here, as well as at Chelmsford. One such pub was The White Hart  (now a nightclub called Sugar Hut ) One of the oldest buildings in Brentwood; it is believed to have been built in 1480 although apocryphal evidence suggests a hostelry might have stood on the site as much as a hundred years earlier and been visited in 1392 by Richard II, whose coat of arms included a White Hart. The ground floor was originally stabling and in the mid-1700s the owners ran their own coach service to London. On 13 September 2009, the building and roof suffered significant damage during a fire. The building now shows little of its original historic interest,

Marygreen Manor, a handsome 16th-century building on London Road, is mentioned in Samuel Pepys' diaries and is said to have been often visited by the Tudor monarch Henry VIII when Henry Roper, Gentleman Pursuant to Queen Catherine of Aragon, lived there in 1514. It is now a hotel and restaurant. In 1686 Brentwood's inns were estimated to provide 110 beds and stabling for 183 horses. There were 11 inns in the town in 1788.

Protestant martyr William Hunter was burnt at the stake in Brentwood in 1555. A monument to him was erected by subscription in 1861 at Wilson's Corner. Brentwood School was founded in 1557 and established in 1558, in Ingrave Road and behind the greens on Shenfield Road by Sir Anthony Browne and the site of Hunter's execution in commemorated by a plaque in the school. Thomas Munn, 'gentleman brickmaker' of Brentwood, met a less noble end when he was hanged for robbing the Yarmouth mail and his body was exhibited in chains at Gallows Corner, a road junction a few miles from Brentwood, in Romford. A ducking stool was mentioned in 1584.

As the Roman road grew busier, Brentwood became a major coaching stop for stagecoaches, with plenty of inns for overnight accommodation as the horses were rested. This has not changed; there is an above average number of pubs in the area - possibly due to the army being stationed at Warley Barracks until 1958. Some of the pubs date back to the 15th and 16th centuries. Brentwood was also significant as a hub for the London postal service, with a major post office since the 18th century. The major post office on the high street was closed in the 2008 budget cuts; Brentwood residents now must rely on sub-post offices.

Daniel Defoe wrote about Brentwood as being "...full of good inns, and chiefly maintained by the excessive multitude of carriers and passengers, which are constantly passing this way to London, with droves of cattle, provisions and manufactures."

The 'Brentwood Ring', the earliest Christian ring ever to have been discovered in Britain was found in Brentwood in the late 1940s. It now resides at the British Museum in London. The only other ring of its type in existence can be found at the Vatican Museum in Rome.

Modern history
Brentwood originated as an ancient parish of 460 acres (1.86 km2). In 1891 the population was 4,949. Under the Local Government Act 1894, the Brentwood parish formed part of the Billericay Rural District of Essex. In 1899 the parish was removed from the rural district and formed the Brentwood Urban District. In 1934 the parish and district were enlarged by gaining Hutton, Ingrave and South Weald. The district and parish was abolished in 1974 by the Local Government Act 1972, and Brentwood urban district was joined with the parishes of Ingatestone and Fryerning, Mountnessing, Doddinghurst, Blackmore, Navestock, Kelvedon Hatch, and Stondon Massey to form the Brentwood district with a total area of 36,378 acres. In 1976 the new district was divided into 18 wards, with 39 councillors. In 1993, Brentwood gained borough status. in 2022 it was announced that the service provision of Brentwood Borough would be delivered via a strategic partnership with Rochford District Council with  "The aim of the strategic partnership is to maximise opportunities and enhance financial resilience."

In 1917, the Roman Catholic church on Ingrave road was awarded cathedral status. Between 1989 and 1991 the building was modified to an Italianate Classical style. Brentwood Cathedral is currently the seat of the Roman Catholic Bishop of Brentwood.

Incidentally, Ingatestone Hall, noted for its Roman Catholic connections through the Petres, is a 16th-century manor house built by Sir William Petre at Yenge-atte-Stone. The staunch Petres played a significant role in the preservation of the Catholic faith in England. Sir William was assistant to Thomas Cromwell when Henry VIII sought to dissolve the monasteries and ascended to the confidential post of Secretary of State, throughout the revolutionary changes of four Tudor monarchs: Henry VIII, Edward VI, Mary I, and Elizabeth I. Queen Mary, in 1553, on her way to claim her crown in London, stopped at Ingatestone Hall; later, Queen Elizabeth I spent several nights at the hall on her royal progress of 1561.

Today, Ingatestone Hall, like all other large Tudor houses, is an expression of wealth and status and retains many of the features of a 16th-century knightly residence, despite alterations by descendants who still live in the house. Ingatestone Hall represented the exterior of Bleak House in the 2005 television adaptation of Charles Dickens' novel, and also appeared in an episode of the television series Lovejoy. It is open to the public for tours, concerts, and performances; the hall and grounds can be rented for weddings and other occasions.

Brentwood was the location of Warley Hospital, a psychiatric hospital, from 1853 to 2001. A British East India Company elephant training school was based in Brentwood and this remained an active army base as a depot for the Essex Regiment until 1959,  when much of the site was redeveloped as the European headquarters for the Ford Motor Company. A few buildings remain from the Barracks – the regimental chapel, the gymnasium (now home to Brentwood Trampoline Club) and the officers' mess (now Marillac Hospital).

Military history
The military has associations with Warley going back over 200 years. It also had strategic importance during the time of the Spanish Armada - it was used as a meeting place for contingents from eight eastern and midland counties (900 horsemen assembled here) to then travel on to Tilbury. The local common was used as a military camp in 1742, and became a permanent feature as Warley Barracks in 1804.

During World War II, over 1,000 bombs were dropped on Brentwood, with 19 flying bombs (V1), 32 long-range rockets (V2) and many incendiary bombs and parachute mines. 5,038 houses were destroyed, 389 people were injured and 43 died. The 15th- and 16th-century pubs, however, survived. Brentwood had been considered a safe enough haven to evacuate London children here - 6,000 children arrived in September 1939 alone.

Today

The town is increasingly suburban, but it does have a very rural feel, with trees, fields and open spaces all around the town; Shenfield Common is also less than one mile from town centre shops.

Brentwood's high street has also been subject to major redevelopment works costing between £3 million and £7 million. This included the demolition of the Sir Charles Napier pub to build an additional lane to improve traffic flow at the west end of the high street, and re-laying the pavements and road surface in the high street itself.

Education
Secondary schools include Brentwood County High School, Brentwood School, St Martin's School and Becket Keys Church of England School.

Primary schools include St Helens Catholic Junior School, St Peters C of E, St Thomas of Canterbury C of E, Warley Primary, Willowbrook Primary, Holly Trees Primary and Hogarth Primary.

Business
The Ford Motor Company's United Kingdom headquarters were located in the suburb of Warley until 2018.

From the financial services sector, Equity Insurance Group, comprising Equity Red Star (of Lloyd's of London), affinity provider Equity Direct Broking Limited and motorcycle insurance broker Bike Team, is headquartered in the town centre. General insurance broker Brents was established in the town in 1963. The Bank of New York Mellon also has a substantial presence in Brentwood, as does LV=, employing 350 people there.

The previous headquarters of electronics company Amstrad were located in Brentwood. The television show The Apprentice used overhead views of the Canary Wharf business district in London as an accompaniment to interior shots of the previous Amstrad offices, Amstrad House, which has since been converted into a Premier Inn hotel.

Well-known businesses that used to operate in the town include vacuum flask manufacturer Thermos, and Nissen whose UK factory and headquarters were established in the town by Ted Blake in the mid-1960s but closed in the 1980s.

The unemployment rate in Brentwood is 1.9%.

Local government and politics

Brentwood forms part of the larger Borough of Brentwood, which also encompasses the surrounding smaller suburbs and villages and is based at Brentwood Town Hall. For elections to Westminster, Brentwood forms part of the Brentwood and Ongar constituency.

There is a proposal for creating Dunton Garden Suburb on land between Basildon and Brentwood. This proposal may have 6,000 homes, together with retail, commercial and leisure uses. This is a join proposal of the two councils and a public consultation ended in March 2015. The proposal has met with criticism from all political parties and the residents group Residents Against Inappropriate Development

Arts and media
The Brentwood Theatre and The Hermitage are the main cultural buildings in Brentwood, located on the same site in the town centre.

Brentwood Theatre is a fully fitted community theatre that serves more than 40 non-professional performing arts groups.  Owned and maintained by an independent charity, Brentwood Theatre receives no regular arts funding or subsidy.  The Hermitage is used as the centre for Brentwood Youth Service.

The Hermitage youth service operates its own cafe, youth club and a live music venue called The Hermit, which has had hosted bands such as Motörhead and InMe. InMe were heavily supported in their early years by the venue, whose purpose is to promote and encourage youth bands. It also plays host to private events such as a weekly jazz club that was run by the saxophonist Spike Robinson until his death. Both venues co-host the Brentwood Blues Festival, a music event that has played host to the Blockheads and Bill Wyman. The Brentwood Centre, on the edge of town, hosts the annual Brentwood Festival which has included acts such as UB40 and The Dualers.

A community radio station, Phoenix FM serves the Brentwood area. The station was formed in August 1996 and broadcast ten trial broadcasts under a restricted service licence, each lasting 28 days, the first starting on 29 December 1996 and the last ending on 25 February 2006. On 23 March 2007, the station started to broadcast permanently on 98.0 FM, featuring popular music, local musicians and acts, local events, and interviews with key local figures.

The Brentwood Art Trail has become a popular annual summer event which was developed to create an arts experience whereby art created by local people can be recognised and appreciated.

Brentwood is also home to the Brentwood Imperial Youth Band, which perform at many events throughout the year. It is a successful band and attracts youngsters from the age of 10 from Brentwood and surrounding areas. It was the first British band to ever take part in the Tournament of Roses Parade in Pasadena, California and the first youth band to play the Spasskaya Tower Military Music Festival and Tattoo on Moscow's Red Square. It meets twice a week in Warley.

Among the many theatre companies in the region, Brentwood Operatic Society and Shenfield Operatic Society are two that represent the many groups providing excellent theatrical productions for the community. Brentwood Operatic Society also trains young actors with its BOSSY Youth acting program, headed by Gaynor Wilson, who formerly directed actor Stephen Moyer. David Pickthall serves as musical director when not scoring films and television shows for the BBC, directing British orchestras, and composing. The award-winning composer wrote two operas and three musicals, published worldwide by Samuel French Ltd. He is also the musical voice of the villainous penguin in the Oscar-winning Wallace & Grommit: The Wrong Trousers.

Brentwood's Orchestras for Young People was founded in 1990 and grew to include five ensembles for orchestral instrumentalists of school age, who perform regularly in and around the town. Regular rehearsals and workshops introduce the musicians to a wide variety of music, from well-known classical pieces to modern music.

The Brentwood Performing Arts Festival has now been accepted into membership by the British and International Federation of Festivals of which Queen Elizabeth II is patron.  With this, the Festival has achieved recognition as the Festival of Performing Arts for Brentwood.

The town is the venue of the Brentwood International Chess Congress which was set up in 2006 and first ran 17–18 February 2007. The congress attracted 235 competitors who included three Grandmasters and five International Masters. The prize fund is relatively generous in comparison to many other similar congresses, being around £4,000. In 2007 it was the largest chess competition to be held in Essex and was organised by Brentwood Chess Club.

Sport, parks and open spaces
Although close to the extremities of Greater London, Brentwood is surrounded by open countryside and woodland.  This has been cited as showing the success of the Metropolitan Green Belt in halting the outward spread of London's built-up area.

Brentwood has a number of public open spaces including King George V Playing Field, Shenfield Common, and two country parks at South Weald and Thorndon. Weald Country Park was first chosen to hold the 2012 Olympics mountain biking but was declared to be "too easy" a course. Brentwood does however host a number of Criterium Cycle Races that attract many of Britain's greatest cyclists.

The town has two large sports centres providing access to a range of sports including badminton, squash, swimming, and football. There are a number of golf courses, including a 70-par municipal course very close to the town centre at Hartswood as well as others in the surrounding countryside. A number of cricket clubs exist in and around the town although the County Ground, closest to the town centre, no longer hosts Essex matches. Brentwood is also home to non-league football club Brentwood Town F.C. and basketball team London Leopards, who both play at the Brentwood Centre Arena. The town is also home to London league club Brentwood RLFC, the only rugby league club in west Essex. Brentwood Hockey Club is also based in the town at the Old County Ground and fielded 6 men's and 5 ladies' league teams for the 2014–15 season.

In 2022, a new track and field athletics club was established using the track located at Brentwood School.  With more than 250 active members, Brentwood Beagles Athletics Clubtakes athletes from the age of five through to all masters aged athletes across all track and field, road running and cross country disciplines and event groups.  In their first year of operation they have already had athletes competing nationally and also representing the county in a range of events.  First year wins and trophies include the U13G 2022/23 Essex XC Relay Champions, six county championship medals, a number of Essex Schools Vests, County vests and national medals.  In September 2022, the Beagles appointed former Chief Executive of Brentwood Borough Council, Bob McLintock, as their inaugural President.

Although no longer manufactured here, Brentwood became the centre of trampolining in the United Kingdom between 1965 and 1981 after George Nissen brought the new sport to the town in 1949 and eventually manufactured trampolines in the town, continuing to do so for many years after they ceased production in the US for fear of litigation. Ted Blake, a long-term Brentwood resident, was managing director of Nissen UK from its inception until shortly before it closed and became a leading figure worldwide in the development of modern trampolining. Brentwood still has a thriving trampolining community but no longer a local factory.

The town also has a large volleyball club and the only handball club in Essex.

Notable people

 Trevor Brooking - former footballer and pundit
 Frank Bruno - boxer
 Leddra Chapman - singer
 Steve Davis - snooker player
Flynn Downes - footballer
 Jonathan Firth - actor
 Barry Hearn - sports investor
 Jonty Hearnden - television presenter
 Johnny Herbert - three time Formula One race winner and winner of 1991 Le Mans 24 hours
 John Jervis - admiral of the fleet and patron of Nelson
 Matthew Jorysz - organist
 Sarah Kane - playwright
 Ross Kemp - actor
 Carlton Leach - former criminal
 Pixie Lott - singer
 Jodie Marsh - glamour model
 Perry McCarthy - Formula One driver (former Top Gear Stig)
 Dave McPherson - musician
 Billy Murray - actor
 Noel Moore - civil servant
 Stephen Moyer - actor
 Jesy Nelson - former member of pop group Little Mix
 Ray Parlour - footballer
 Eric Pickles - Conservative MP
 Louise Redknapp - model and singer
 Neil Ruddock - former footballer
 Jeff Randall - journalist
 Logan Sama - grime DJ
 Ellie Taylor - comedian
 Rhys Thomas - actor, director, comedian, producer and writer
 Fatima Whitbread - olympic medallist
 Paul Wickens - musician
 Danny Young - actor

Brentwood School pupils:
 Douglas Adams - writer
 Robin Day - British political broadcaster and commentator
 Noel Edmonds - television presenter
 Frank Lampard - footballer 
 Griff Rhys Jones - actor
 Jack Straw - English politician

Transport

Buses
Brentwood is served by a number of bus services, many being operated by First Essex. The other main bus service providers include Ensignbus, Arriva Shires & Essex and Stagecoach London. London Buses route 498 links Romford with Brentwood and operates daily.

Road
The A12, which runs between London and Lowestoft, by-passes the town to the north and the London orbital M25 motorway is located 1.2 miles (2 km) to the south-west of the town. The A128, which links Ongar with Orsett, travels through the centre of the town. The A129 travels through the north and east of the town, connecting Brentwood with Billericay and Hadleigh. The A1023 passes through Brentwood, connecting the town with the A12.

Railway
Brentwood railway station is located to the south of the town centre and is served by Elizabeth line services between London Liverpool Street and Shenfield.

Also within the borough of Brentwood are Ingatestone and Shenfield stations, which provide fast services to Liverpool Street and East Anglia; West Horndon hosts services between London Fenchurch Street and Shoeburyness.

The nearest London Underground stations are situated just outside of the Borough of Brentwood, at Newbury Park (Central line) and Upminster (District line).

References

External links

 http://www.activbrentwood.com - Comprehensive Guide to Brentwood
 Brentwood Borough Council - Welcome to Brentwood (PDF)
 Churches in Brentwood - The Website of Churches Together in Brentwood
 BBC's H2G2 Entry on Brentwood
 

 
Towns in Essex
Towns with cathedrals in the United Kingdom
Borough of Brentwood
Unparished areas in Essex
Former civil parishes in Essex